Khadija Baker is a Syrian Kurdish and Canadian artist and performer who lives in Montreal.

Her multimedia work reflects her own experiences of forced displacement and trauma and has been shown globally including at the Atassi Foundation at Alserkal, Dubai, the 3rd Istanbul International Triennial, Istanbul, Turkey; the 6th DocuAsia Forum, Vancouver, Canada; the 12th International Exile Film Festival, Gothenburg, Sweden; the 27th Instant Video festival, Marseille, France; the inaugural Syria Contemporary Art Fair, Beirut, Lebanon; the 17th CONTACT Photo Festival, Toronto, Canada; the 18th Biennale of Sydney, Australia; the 6th OFTTA festival, Montréal, Canada; the 10th International Diaspora Film Festival, Toronto, Canada; Alwan gallery New York, USA; and the official exhibition marking Damascus’ role as the 2008 UNESCO Arab Capital of Culture, Damascus, Syria – as well as well as group shows in Vienna, Austria; Paris, France; Berlin, Germany; Delhi, India; Beirut, Lebanon; London, UK; New York and San Francisco, USA. She also showed locally at  A Space Gallery, Gallery 101, M.A.I (Montreal, arts interculturels), Karash-Masson Gallery, Stewart Hall Art Gallery.

Education 
Born in Amûdê, Rojava, Baker moved to Montreal in 2001 and has MFA Open Media degree in fine arts from Concordia University.

Career 

Her work combines sculpture, sound, textiles, and video and is inspired by her lived experience of trauma and forced displacement. Baker uses art to critique the treatment of Kurds in Syria.

She has won funding awards from the Conseil des arts et des lettres du Québec and the Canada Council for the Arts. 

She has exhibited locally and international including her 2009 Coffin Nest exhibition in Damascus about Iraq's mass graves, at the 18th Biennale of Sydney in 2012, as well as in Amsterdam, Beirut, Berlin, London, Los Angeles, Marseille, Montreal, New York City, Paris, Rome, San Francisco, Seoul, and Tokyo.
Baker is a member of TASHT collective, which was created 2016, collective originally come from the Middle East. Hourig is Armenian, but born in Lebanon; Khadija is Kurdish from Syria; Shahrzad is Iranian; and Kumru is Kurdish hailing from Turkey. 1 Having lived in volatile regions before calling Canada home, all four women have inherited memories of atrocities from their families, just as they have all lived through civil wars, military coups, bloody revolutions, and political repressions. It is these inherited and difficult lived memories that compose the fabric of their individual interdisciplinary work and the broader canvas of our collective work together

In 2020, Baker was Cultural Diversity in Visual Arts Award winner. In 2018, the Stewart Hall Art Gallery hosted her Trajectoires exhibition that she created with artists Lysette Yoselevitz and Dorothée Nowak. The exhibition was also later featured at the Maison de la culture Mercier.

Her Birds Crossing Borders multimedia piece featuring Muzna Dureid, and two other anonymous Syrian women, was exhibited at the Salle de diffusion de Parc-Extension in 2022.

References 

Living people
Concordia University alumni
Syrian artists
Syrian women artists
Kurdish artists
Kurdish women artists
Syrian emigrants to Canada
21st-century Kurdish people
21st-century Syrian women
21st-century Syrian people
20th-century Kurdish people
Year of birth missing (living people)